Pantelis Pitsillos (Greek: Παντελής Πίτσιλλος; born August 31, 1989 in Limassol) is a Cypriot football player who currently plays for Karmiotissa in the Cypriot Second Division.

External links
 

1989 births
Living people
Cypriot footballers
AEL Limassol players
Alki Larnaca FC players
Aris Limassol FC players
Ermis Aradippou FC players
AEK Kouklia F.C. players
Pafos FC players
Othellos Athienou F.C. players
Karmiotissa FC players
Cyprus under-21 international footballers
Cypriot First Division players
Association football defenders 
Association football midfielders